Natternbach is a municipality in the district of Grieskirchen in the Austrian state of Upper Austria.

Geography
Natternbach lies in the Hausruckviertel. About 36 percent of the municipality is forest, and 58 percent is farmland.

References

Cities and towns in Grieskirchen District